Alison Nicola Pérez Barone (born 5 February 1990 in Isidoro Noblía, Cerro Largo), known as Nicola Pérez, is a Uruguayan footballer who plays as a goalkeeper for Chilean Primera División club Ñublense.

Club career
Pérez started his career playing with El Tanque Sisley. He made his professional debut during the 2010/11 season.

References

1990 births
Living people
Uruguayan footballers
Association football goalkeepers
Uruguayan Primera División players
Chilean Primera División players
Expatriate footballers in Chile
Club Nacional de Football players
El Tanque Sisley players
Club Atlético River Plate (Montevideo) players
C.A. Progreso players
Ñublense footballers